The Kangra Fort is located 20 kilometers from the town of Dharamsala on the outskirts of the town of Kangra, in the Kangra district of Himachal Pradesh, India.

History
 
                                
The Kangra Fort was built by the ruling Katoch Rajput dynasty. Raja Dharam Chand submitted to the Mughal Ruler Akbar in 1556 and agreed to pay tribute, including, renouncing claims to the fort. But in 1620, Emperor Jahangir, killed that Katoch king, Raja Hari Chand and annexed the Kangra kingdom into the Mugha lEmpire. Under the leadership of Nawab Ali Khan and aided by JaRaja jagat Singh , the fort was captured in 1620 and under Mughal rule until 1783. In 1621, Jahangir visited it and ordered the slaughter of a bullock there. A mosque was also built within the fort of Kangra.

As the Mughal empire began to crumble, a descendant of Raja Dharam Chand, Raja Sansar Chand Bahadur II began a series of conquests of Kangra with the support of Sikh leader, Jai Singh Kanhaiya of the Kanhaiya misl. However, after the death of Mughal governor Saif Ali Khan, the fort was surrendered in 1783 by his son to the Sikh leader, Jai Singh Kanhaiya of the Kanhaiya Misl in return for safe passage. This betrayal by Jai Singh Kanhaiya led to Raja Sansar Chand soliciting the services of Sikh misaldars Maha Singh of the Sukerchakia Misl (father of Maharaja Ranjit Singh) and Jassa Singh Ramgarhia and besieged the fort. In 1786, Raja Sansar Chand gained Kangra fort by peaceful treaty with Jai Singh Kanhaiya in return for territorial concessions in the Punjab.

Sansar Chand quickly focused on expanding his kingdom and conquered the nearby kingdoms of Chamba, Mandi, Suket and Nahan. In 1805 he turned his attention to Bilaspur and the then Raja of Bilaspur called on the aid of the powerful Gurkha kingdom, who had already acquired Garhwal, Sirmour and other small hill states of Shimla. An army of 40,000 Gurkhas responded by crossing the Sutlej river and quickly captured fort after fort. In 1808, the Gorkhas struck a decisive blow and captured the fort of Pathiyar (Palampur).  

By 1809, Kangra itself was under direct threat from the Gurkhas and Sansar Chand had taken refuge in the Kangra fort. Sansar Chand then turned towards Maharaja Ranjit Singh of Lahore for aid, leading to the Nepal-Sikh war of 1809 in which the Gurkhas were defeated and forced back to the Ghaghara River. In return for his help, Maharaja Ranjit Singh took possession of the ancient fort alongside 76 villages (the fort's ancient Jagir) on Aug 24, 1809 while leaving the rest of Kangra to Sansar Chand. 

The fort was finally taken by the British after the Anglo-Sikh war of 1846.

A British garrison occupied the fort until it was heavily damaged in an earthquake on 4 April 1905.

Layout
The entrance to the fort is through a small courtyard enclosed between two gates which were built during the Sikh period, as appears from an inscription over the entrance. From here a long and narrow passage leads up to the top of the fort, through the Ahani and Amiri Darwaza (gate), both attributed to Nawab Saif Ali Khan, the first Mughal Governor of Kangra. About 500 feet from the outer gate the passage turns round at a very sharp angle and passes through the Jehangiri Darwaza.

The Darsani Darwaza, which is now flanked by defaced statues of River Goddesses Ganga and Yamuna gave access to a courtyard, along the south side of which stood the stone shrines of Lakshmi-Narayana and Ambika Devi and a Jain temple with large idol of Rishabhanatha.

References

Further reading

 Hutchinson, J. & J. PH Vogel (1933). History of the Panjab Hill States, Vol. I. 1st edition: Govt. Printing, Lahore, Punjab, Pakistan. 1933. Reprint 2000. Department of Language and Culture, Himachal Pradesh. Chapter IV   Kangra State, pp. 98–198.
 Royal Family of Kangra and the Durbar-e-Amm museum society. Kangra. Date unknown. Purchased in 2010 in Kangra.

Forts in Himachal Pradesh
Kangra, Himachal Pradesh
Rajput architecture
Buildings and structures in Kangra district
Jain temples in India